James Ellis (15 March 1931 – 8 March 2014) was a Northern Irish actor and theatre director, with a career stretching over sixty years.

Originally a stage actor and director in his native Belfast, he moved to London in the early 1960s. After gaining recognition in Great Britain through the Z-Cars (1962–78) police series on BBC1, he appeared in many other television and film roles. He was also a translator.

Early life
Ellis was born in Belfast and attended Methodist College Belfast and later studied at Queen's University Belfast and trained at the Bristol Old Vic Theatre School.

Career
He began to act with the Belfast-based Ulster Group Theatre in 1952. He first appeared in a revival of the Louis D'Alton play, They Got What They Wanted (1947). Ellis became established as the company's young male lead in such plays as April in Assagh, where he was cast as McFettridge (1954), Is the Priest at Home? as O'Grady (1954), and The Diary of Anne Frank as Peter van Daan (1957). 

While continuing as an actor in the main company, he also undertook the management of the group's summer theatre in the seaside town of Larne, north of Belfast. Ellis's most important roles for the group include the lead role of Christy Mahon in a production of J.M. Synge's The Playboy of the Western World in 1957.

Ellis had a major part to play in the staging of Sam Thompson's even more controversial Over the Bridge (1960). In December 1958 Ellis had been appointed the Group Theatre's Director of Productions, but he resigned this position in July 1959 to direct the production of Thompson's play, which was to be staged by a group of actors and directors who had quit the Group in protest over its decision to withdraw Over the Bridge, which had been in rehearsals, after the Group's board deemed the play too inflammatory.

Ellis soon left Northern Ireland for London, where his first break came when he was cast as Dandy Jordan in the BBC TV production of Stewart Love's The Randy Dandy, which aired on 14 September 1961, an "Angry" play that was deemed so controversial and sexually charged that the BBC gave a warning before the transmission that it was "unsuitable for people of a nervous disposition".

His success as Dandy made him a sought-after actor and led to subsequent roles with the BBC and ITV, including as Philip in the BBC production of Stewart Love's The Sugar Cube (transmitted 21 June 1961) and ultimately his role as Bert Lynch in Z-Cars (1962–78). In this police series, set in the fictional Newtown in Lancashire, his character rose from the rank of PC to Inspector over the series run. Ellis appeared in 629 episodes of this series, an all-time record for any actor's appearances in a TV detective/police series. The impact of Z-Cars was such that he became a household name in this era.

From 1982, he portrayed Norman Martin, the violent and troubled father, in the "Billy" trilogy of plays by Graham Reid, all of which were broadcast as part of the Play for Today series. The first of the plays, Too Late to Talk to Billy, was followed by A Matter of Choice for Billy (1983) and A Coming to Terms for Billy (1984). A postscript to the trilogy, Lorna, was broadcast in 1987. In the mid-1980s Ellis was a member of the team of interviewers on "Afternoon Plus", produced by Thames Television.

He appeared in Doctor Who, In Sickness and in Health, Ballykissangel, Playing the Field, One By One and the cult sitcom Nightingales, with Robert Lindsay and David Threlfall.

In Antonia Bird's Priest (1994), from a screenplay by Jimmy McGovern, he played Father Ellerton. Ellis also contributed cameos to popular series such as Boys from the Blackstuff by Alan Bleasdale, Only Fools and Horses, The Bill, Casualty, Boon, Common as Muck, Birds of a Feather, Lovejoy and Heartbeat.

He was the subject of This Is Your Life in 2001 when he was surprised by Michael Aspel.

Ellis was also a writer of poems and prose and a translator. The BBC broadcast a selection of his adaptations from French in 2007. In July 2008, Queen's University Belfast awarded Ellis an honorary doctorate as part of its centenary celebrations.

Personal life
Ellis's first marriage was to actress Beth Ellis with whom he had three children, Amanda, Adam and Hugo. They divorced in the late 1960s. In 1976 Ellis married his second wife, Robina, by whom he had another son, Toto. Adam Ellis was murdered in London in August 1988. The murderer was sentenced to life imprisonment in 1989.

Ellis's second son, Hugo, followed his father into professional acting and directing. Hugo died by suicide in January 2011, aged 49.

Death
Ellis died of a stroke on 8 March 2014 in Lincoln, aged 82. He is interred in Castlereagh Presbyterian Churchyard in Belfast.

Legacy

The James Ellis Bridge in East Belfast, on a route between CS Lewis Square and Victoria Park, was opened in March 2017 by his widow Robina, three years after Ellis' death.

References

External links

Further reading

1931 births
2014 deaths
Alumni of Queen's University Belfast
Alumni of Bristol Old Vic Theatre School
Male television actors from Northern Ireland
People educated at Methodist College Belfast
20th-century male actors from Northern Ireland
21st-century male actors from Northern Ireland
Male stage actors from Northern Ireland
Male actors from Belfast